The personal relationships of James VI and I included relationships with his male courtiers and his marriage to Anne of Denmark, with whom he fathered children. The influence his favourites had on politics, and the resentment at the wealth they acquired, became major political issues during his reign.

James (born 1566) did not know his parents—his father, Henry Stuart, Lord Darnley, was murdered in 1567, and his mother, Mary, Queen of Scots, was forced to flee when she married the suspected murderer, James Hepburn, 4th Earl of Bothwell. His maternal grandparents died before he was born; his paternal grandfather was killed in a skirmish while James was still a boy, and his paternal grandmother lived in England. He had no siblings. His first documented male favourite, at the age of 13, was his older relative Esmé Stewart, 1st Duke of Lennox.

James adopted a severe stance towards sodomy using English law. His book on kingship, (Greek for 'Royal Gift') lists sodomy among those "horrible crimes which ye are bound in conscience never to forgive". He also singled out sodomy in a letter to Lord Burleigh giving directives that Judges were to interpret the law broadly and were not to issue any pardons, saying that "no more colour may be left to judges to work upon their wits in that point."

However, nearly two centuries later, Jeremy Bentham, in an unpublished manuscript, denounced James as a hypocrite after his crackdown: "[James I], if he be the author of that first article of the works which bear his name, and which indeed were owned by him, reckons this practise among the few offences which no Sovereign ever ought to pardon. This must[...] seem rather extraordinary to those who have a notion that a pardon in this case is what he himself, had he been a subject, might have stood in need of."

Esmé Stewart, 1st Duke of Lennox

At the age of 13, James made his formal entry into Edinburgh. Upon arriving he met the 37-year-old, married, father of 5 children, Franco-Scottish lord Esmé Stewart, 6th Lord d'Aubigny, whom the Puritan leader Sir James Melville described as "of nature, upright, just, and gentle". Having arrived from France, Stewart was an exotic visitor who fascinated the young James. The two became extremely close and it was said by an English observer that "from the time he was 14 years old and no more, that is, when the Lord Stuart came into Scotland[...] even then he began[...] to clasp some one in the embraces of his great love, above all others" and that James became "in such love with him as in the open sight of the people often he will clasp him about the neck with his arms and kiss him".

The King first made Aubigny a gentleman of the bedchamber. Later, he appointed him to the Privy Council and created him earl and finally duke of Lennox. In Presbyterian Scotland the thought of a Catholic duke irked many, and Lennox had to make a choice between his Catholic faith or his loyalty to James. At the end Lennox chose James and the king taught him the doctrines of Calvinism. The Scottish Kirk remained suspicious of Lennox after his public conversion and took alarm when he had the earl of Morton tried and beheaded on charges of treason. The Scottish ministry was also warned that the duke sought to "draw the King to carnal lust".

In response the Scottish nobles plotted to oust Lennox. They did so by luring James to Ruthven Castle as a guest but then kept him as prisoner for ten months. The Lord Enterprisers forced him to banish Lennox. The duke journeyed back to France and kept a secret correspondence with James. Lennox in these letters says he gave up his family "to dedicate myself entirely to you"; he prayed to die for James to prove "the faithfulness which is engraved within my heart, which will last forever." The former duke wrote "Whatever might happen to me, I shall always be your faithful servant... you are alone in this world whom my heart is resolved to serve. And would to God that my breast might be split open so that it might be seen what is engraven therein."

James was devastated by the loss of Lennox. In his return to France, Lennox had met a frosty reception as an apostate Catholic. The Scottish nobles had thought that they would be proven right in their convictions that Lennox's conversion was artificial when he returned to France. Instead the former duke remained Presbyterian and died shortly after, leaving James his embalmed heart. James had repeatedly vouched for Lennox's religious sincerity and memorialized him in a poem called Ane Tragedie of the Phoenix, which likened him to an exotic bird of unique beauty killed by envy.

Anne of Denmark

Following Esme's death James married Anne of Denmark in 1589 to establish a strong Protestant alliance in Continental Europe, a policy he continued by marrying his daughter to the future King of Bohemia. James was initially said to be infatuated with his wife and gallantly crossed the North Sea with a royal retinue to collect her after Anne's initial efforts to sail to England were thwarted by storms. In July 1592, James Halkerston was suspected of writing verses that suggested King James was homosexual and left his wife a virgin.

King James, however, was unfaithful to her (during her pregnancy with Prince Henry) with Anne Murray. The marriage later cooled and was marked by several marital frictions. Queen Anne was particularly upset with James placing the infant Prince Henry in the custody of John Erskine, Earl of Mar at Stirling Castle, in keeping with Scottish royal tradition. In the course of the marriage, Anne's relationship with her husband alternated between affection and estrangement. The two had 8 children with the last being born during 1607 although some sources cite that by 1606, they had already started living in separate establishments. James lost interest in his wife and it was said that she led a sad, reclusive life afterward, appearing at court functions on occasion. Despite his neglect of Anne, James was affected by her death and was moved to compose a poem in her memory.

Anne Murray
Between 1593 and 1595, James was romantically linked with Anne Murray, later Lady Glamis, whom he addressed in verse as "my mistress and my love" in a poem he wrote called Ane dreame on his Mistris the Lady Glammis. She was the daughter of John Murray, 1st Earl of Tullibardine, master of the king's household. Anne also had different names, particularly in official documents such as those that discussed her marriage to Lord Glamis. She was referred to as Agnes and Annas Murray of Tullibardine.

Children
Three of James's children grew to adulthood: Henry Frederick, Prince of Wales, Elizabeth of Bohemia and Charles I of England. Henry died from typhoid fever at the age of 18. Elizabeth, at the age of 16, married Frederick V, then Elector of the Electorate of the Palatinate, and took up her place in the court at Heidelberg (Germany). Charles grew up in the shadow of his elder brother, but following Henry's death he became heir to the throne, and succeeded his father in 1625.

Robert Carr, 1st Earl of Somerset
A few years later after the controversy over his relationship with Lennox faded away he began a relationship with Robert Carr. In 1607, at a royal jousting contest, the 17-year-old Carr, the son of Sir Thomas Carr or Kerr of Ferniehirst, was knocked from a horse and broke his leg. According to Thomas Howard, 1st Earl of Suffolk, James fell in love with the young man, and as the years progressed showered Carr with gifts. Carr was made a gentleman of the bedchamber and he was noted for his handsome appearance as well as his limited intelligence; he was also made a Knight of the Garter, a Privy Counsellor and Viscount Rochester. His downfall came through Frances Howard, a beautiful young married woman. Upon Rochester's request, James stacked a court of bishops that would allow her to divorce her husband in order to marry Rochester. As a wedding present Rochester was created Earl of Somerset.

In 1615, James fell out with Somerset. In a letter James complained, among other matters, that Somerset had been "creeping back and withdrawing yourself from lying in my chamber, notwithstanding my many hundred times earnest soliciting you to the contrary" and that he rebuked James "more sharply and bitterly than ever my master Buchanan durst do".

At this point public scandal erupted when the underkeeper of the tower revealed that Somerset's new wife had poisoned Sir Thomas Overbury, his best friend who had opposed the marriage. James, angered over Somerset's attachment to his wife, exploited the opportunity and forcefully insisted that they face trial.

Though Somerset refused to admit any guilt, his wife confessed, and both were sentenced to death. The King commuted the sentence. Nevertheless, they were imprisoned in the Tower for seven years, after which they were pardoned and allowed to retire to a country estate.

George Villiers, 1st Duke of Buckingham

The last of James's three male lovers was George Villiers, the son of a Leicestershire knight. They had met in 1614, around the same time that the situation with Somerset was deteriorating. Buckingham was described as exceptionally handsome, intelligent and honest. In 1615 James knighted him and 8 years later he was the first commoner in more than a century to be elevated to a dukedom — as Duke of Buckingham — although he had first been raised in sequence as a Knight of the Garter and Viscount Villiers, as Earl of Buckingham then Marquess of Buckingham. Restoration of Apethorpe Hall, undertaken 2004–2008, revealed a previously unknown passage linking the bedchambers of James and Villiers.

The King was blunt and unashamed in his avowal of love for Buckingham and compared it to Jesus' love of John:

17th century commentators, such as poet Théophile de Viau wrote plainly about the king's relationship. In his poem, de Viau wrote: "Apollo with his songs / debauched young Hyacinthus,[...] And it is well known that the king of England / fucks the Duke of Buckingham."

Buckingham became good friends with James's wife Anne of Denmark; she addressed him in affectionate letters begging him to be "always true" to her husband. In a letter to James, Buckingham said "sir, all the way hither I entertained myself, your unworthy servant, with this dispute, whether you loved me now... better than at the time which I shall never forget at Farnham, where the bed's head could not be found between the master and his dog". James in some letters addressed him as his spouse saying that "I desire only to live in this world for your sake... I had rather live banished in any part of the Earth with you than live a sorrowful widow's life without you... God bless you, my sweet child and wife, and grant that ye may ever be a comfort to your dear dad and husband". When James I died in March 1625, Buckingham was in France on a diplomatic mission but news of his death brought him to tears.

References

Further reading
 , historiography.
 Young, Michael B. (2000) King James and the History of Homosexuality. New York: New York University Press.

External links
Essay on the sexuality of James I
Celebration of "Queen" James Bible

LGBT history in the United Kingdom
LGBT royalty
16th century in LGBT history
James VI and I
Personal life and relationships of individuals
Marriage, unions and partnerships in England
Marriage, unions and partnerships in Scotland